State Route 305 (SR 305) is a  long east–west state highway in the northeastern portion of the U.S. state of Ohio. The western terminus of SR 305 is at a signalized intersection with the duplex of SR 82 and SR 700 in the village of Hiram. Picking up where SR 305 leaves off heading southeast into Pennsylvania from this intersection is PA 718.

Route description

SR 305's path takes it through the northeastern quadrant of Portage County and across the central part of Trumbull County.  There are no segments of SR 305 that are included as a part of the National Highway System (NHS).  The NHS is a network of highways identified as being most important for the economy, mobility and defense of the nation.

History
SR 305 was applied in 1932.  The highway was originally a very short route that existed only along its present easternmost stretch between its junction with SR 7 and its connection with PA 718 at the Pennsylvania state line.  This remained the case until 1937, when SR 305 was extended west along previously un-numbered roads across Trumbull County and into northeastern Portage County to its current western terminus in Hiram.

Major intersections

References

External links

State Route 305 Endpoint Photos

305
Transportation in Portage County, Ohio
Transportation in Trumbull County, Ohio